Missouri District Warehouse, also known as the Weston Tobacco Warehouse and Weston Burley House No. 1, is a historic warehouse located at Weston, Platte County, Missouri.  It was built in 1937, and is a sprawling, two-story, rectangular, steel-frame building sheathed with corrugated metal. It measures 125 feet by 300 feet. It was built as a loose-leaf tobacco auction warehouse and curing barn.

It was listed on the National Register of Historic Places in 2010.

References

Industrial buildings and structures on the National Register of Historic Places in Missouri
Industrial buildings completed in 1937
Buildings and structures in Platte County, Missouri
National Register of Historic Places in Platte County, Missouri
Tobacco buildings in the United States